A streak camera is an instrument for measuring the variation in a pulse of light's intensity with time. They are used to measure the pulse duration of some ultrafast laser systems and for applications such as time-resolved spectroscopy and LIDAR.

Mechanical types
Mechanical streak cameras use a rotating mirror or moving slit system to deflect the light beam. They are limited in their maximum scan speed and thus temporal resolution.

Optoelectronic type
Optoelectronic streak cameras work by directing the light onto a photocathode, which when hit by photons produces electrons via the photoelectric effect. The electrons are accelerated in a cathode ray tube and pass through an electric field produced by a pair of plates, which deflects the electrons sideways. By modulating the electric potential between the plates, the electric field is quickly changed to give a time-varying deflection of the electrons, sweeping the electrons across a phosphor screen at the end of the tube. A linear detector, such as a charge-coupled device (CCD) array is used to measure the streak pattern on the screen, and thus the temporal profile of the light pulse.

The time-resolution of the best optoelectronic streak cameras is around 180 femtoseconds. Measurement of pulses shorter than this duration requires other techniques such as optical autocorrelation and frequency-resolved optical gating (FROG).

In December 2011, a team at MIT released images combining the use of a streak camera with repeated laser pulses to simulate a movie with a frame rate of one trillion frames per second. This was surpassed in 2020 by a team from Caltech that achieved frame rates of 70 trillion fps.

See also
 Photo finish, which uses a much slower but 2-dimensional version of a camera mapping time into a spatial dimension
 Femto-photography

References

Optical metrology